The African qualification tournament for the 2016 women's Olympic volleyball tournament was held in Yaoundé, Cameroon, from 12 to 16 February 2016.

Pools composition

Venue
 Yaoundé Multipurpose Sports Complex, Yaoundé, Cameroon

Pool standing procedure
 Number of matches won
 Match points
 Sets ratio
 Points ratio
 Result of the last match between the tied teams

Match won 3–0 or 3–1: 3 match points for the winner, 0 match points for the loser
Match won 3–2: 2 match points for the winner, 1 match point for the loser

Preliminary round
All times are West Africa Time (UTC+01:00).

Pool A

Pool B

Final round
All times are West Africa Time (UTC+01:00).

5th–6th places

Final four

Semifinals

3rd place match

Final

Final standing

See also
Volleyball at the 2016 Summer Olympics – Men's African qualification

References

External links
Official website

2016 in volleyball
Volleyball qualification for the 2016 Summer Olympics
2016 in women's volleyball
Vol